The , officially the , is a Japanese trolleybus line in Tateyama, Toyama, operated by the Tateyama Kurobe Kankō Company. The line is entirely underground (in tunnel), including both termini. It is the last remaining trolleybus line in Japan with the conversion of the Kanden Tunnel Trolleybus line to battery operation in November 2018. It is also the last remaining right-hand drive trolleybus line in the world. The line is a part of the Tateyama Kurobe Alpine Route. The line originally opened as a normal (diesel) bus line in April 1971, but was later re-equipped for trolleybuses.  The trolleybus line opened on 23 April 1996.

Basic data
Distance:  
Stations: 3
Double-track line: None
Electric supply: 600 V DC
Railway signalling: Automatic signal system
Buses start while the signal is clear, and the number of vehicles is counted.
Fleet: 8 trolleybuses, built in 1995–96 by Osaka Sharyo Kogyo (on Mitsubishi Fuso chassis), numbered 8001–8008.

See also
Mount Tate
List of trolleybus systems
List of railway lines in Japan

References

External links

 Tateyama Kurobe Alpine Route official website

Trolleybus transport in Japan
Tateyama Kurobe Alpine Route